Jakov Biljan (born 2 August 1995) is a Croatian football midfielder who plays for HNK Vukovar '91.

References

1995 births
Living people
Footballers from Zagreb
Association football midfielders
Croatian footballers
Croatia youth international footballers
GNK Dinamo Zagreb players
NK Lokomotiva Zagreb players
FC Koper players
GNK Dinamo Zagreb II players
FK Jelgava players
HNK Vukovar '91 players
Croatian Football League players
First Football League (Croatia) players
Slovenian PrvaLiga players
Latvian Higher League players
Croatian expatriate footballers
Expatriate footballers in Slovenia
Croatian expatriate sportspeople in Slovenia
Expatriate footballers in Latvia
Croatian expatriate sportspeople in Latvia